Zvenyhorod is a village in Lviv Raion, Lviv Oblast, in the western part of Ukraine. It belongs to Davydiv rural hromada, one of the hromadas of Ukraine. Zvenyhorod was the capital of the former Principality of Zvenyhorod (11th and 12th centuries).

Until 18 July 2020, Zvenyhorod belonged to Pustomyty Raion. The raion was abolished in July 2020 as part of the administrative reform of Ukraine, which reduced the number of raions of Lviv Oblast to seven. The area of Pustomyty Raion was merged into Lviv Raion.

References

 
Archaeological sites in Ukraine
Rus' settlements
Villages in Lviv Raion